There are two species of lizard named red neusticurus:

 Neusticurus rudis, native to Guyana and Venezuela
 Neusticurus surinamensis, native to Brazil